The Asociación de Mujeres Meretrices de Argentina (AMMAR) is the union of sex workers in Argentina. It is responsible for defending their rights and ensuring the interests of sex workers. It is affiliated with the Central de Trabajadores Argentinos (CTA). In 1997 it became part of the Network of Women Sex Workers from Latin America and the Caribbean (RedTraSex).

History

Beginning
AMMAR’s initial stages began in 1994 when a group of women involved in Argentina’s sex trade organized in Buenos Aires to demand basic human rights and fight police violence. The organization was officially founded and incorporated in March 1995 to the Central de los Trabajadores Argentinos. The Embassy of the Netherlands in the city of Buenos Aires contributed to the installation of the office that the union currently has within the building of the CTA.

In the international arena, starting in 1997 and on the basis of contacts with different organizations nearby, the Sexual Workers Network of Latin America and the Caribbean was created; In it, organizations and focal points of the different countries of the continent are articulated. Elena Reynaga, as representative of Ammar, chairs this network.

Ammar's action contributed to the repeal of police edicts and the decriminalization of street prostitution in the city of Buenos Aires for a brief period, until the reform of Article 71 of the Contraventional Code on March 4, 1999, which again sanctioned the offer of sex on public roads in certain cases.

The murder of Sandra Cabrera
On January 27, 2004, Sandra Cabrera, general secretary of AMMAR in Rosario, was murdered. Cabrera had filed complaints against some local police officers, accusing them of corruption and asking for money from local sex workers in exchange for letting them work. For this reason she received threats, both against her and her daughter. In November 2003 she was brutally beaten inside her home and threatened to stop reporting. She was shot in the head two months after. Her body was found near the bus terminal in Rosario.

Present
In 2003, Elena Reynaga, Secretary General of Ammar, was in charge of closing the "II Meeting on HIV / AIDS in Latin America and the Caribbean," which was held in Cuba. Currently, the union has representation in more than half of the provinces of Argentina and its General Secretary is Georgina Orellano. In March 2015, the Contraventional and Misdemeanor Criminal Justice of the City of Buenos Aires, with the ruling of Court No. 8 by Dr. Natalia Molina, recognized sex work as an illegal activity, condemned the prosecution of sex workers and urged the government to regulate the activity.

In 2013, Ammar commissioned the advertising agency Ogilvy & Mather to produce a series of advertisements in the form of street art. The campaign was named "Corners". The advertisements were placed on street corners. One side wall showed sexualized woman, the other women with children. On the side with children were the words 86 percent of sex workers are mothers. We need a law to regulate our work.

References

External links
Official website

1994 establishments in Argentina
Sex industry in Argentina
Sex worker organisations in Argentina